Martin Lébl (born 12 April 1980, in Prague) is a volleyball player from the Czech Republic. Lébl competed at the 2000 Summer Olympics in the beach volleyball competition alongside Michal Palinek. As an indoor player, he became Best Attacker at the 2001 European Championship, where the men's national team ended up in fourth place. With Lube Banca Marche Macerata he played at the 2008–09 Indesit Champions League and also was individually awarded "Best Spiker".

Clubs
  Lube Banca Marche Macerata (2008–2009)

Awards

Individuals
 2001 European Championship "Best Attacker"
 2008–09 CEV Champions League "Best Spiker"

References

External links
 FIVB Profile

1980 births
Living people
Czech men's volleyball players
Czech beach volleyball players
Beach volleyball players at the 2000 Summer Olympics
Olympic beach volleyball players of the Czech Republic
Sportspeople from Prague
Men's beach volleyball players